Ian King (27 May 1937 — 24 July 2016) was a Scottish footballer. He spent the majority of his career at Leicester City, making up one third of the legendary half-back line with Colin Appleton and Frank McLintock. He made appearances in 244 Leicester City games, including 27 appearances in the FA Cup, and 22 appearances in the League Cup, and 4 in the Cup Winners Cup.

He made his first appearance for Leicester City on 11 September 1957, away against Sheffield Wednesday. King played as a defender, scoring a total of seven goals (including 1 goal in the Football League Cup).

King died on 24 July 2016.

References

External links 

1937 births
2016 deaths
Charlton Athletic F.C. players
Association football central defenders
Leicester City F.C. players
Scottish footballers
English Football League players
People from Loanhead
Arniston Rangers F.C. players
Burton Albion F.C. players
Sportspeople from Midlothian
FA Cup Final players